Will Maher (born 4 November 1995) is an English rugby league footballer who plays as a  forward for Halifax Panthers in the Betfred Championship.

He has previously played for the Castleford Tigers (Heritage № 950) in the Super League, and spent time on loan from Castleford at Oxford and the Keighley Cougars in League 1, and the Batley Bulldogs and Halifax in the Championship.

Background
Will Maher was born in Haverthwaite, near Ulverston, Cumbria, England. He attended Penny Bridge Primary School in Penny Bridge, and John Ruskin School in Coniston, Cumbria.

Playing career
He spent the 2018 season on loan at Halifax in the Betfred Championship.

His brother, Patrick Maher, is a coach at Barrow Raiders.

In October 2022, Maher signed a two year contract with Halifax Panthers.

References

External links
Halifax profile
Castleford Tigers profile
Cas Tigers profile
SL profile

1995 births
Living people
Batley Bulldogs players
Castleford Tigers players
Halifax R.L.F.C. players
Hull Kingston Rovers players
Keighley Cougars players
Oxford Rugby League players
Rugby league players from Cumbria
Rugby league props